Qliance Medical Group was a direct primary care healthcare business based in Seattle, Washington, USA. It was launched in 2007.

Qliance announced its closing on May 15, 2017. Qliance co-founder and CEO Erika Bliss told GeekWire that the company's shutdown was caused by a lender making an "unauthorized withdrawal" of about $200,000 from the company's bank account.

References

External links
 

Companies based in Seattle
American companies established in 2007
Health care companies based in Washington (state)